
Gmina Wąsewo is a rural gmina (administrative district) in Ostrów Mazowiecka County, Masovian Voivodeship, in east-central Poland. Its seat is the village of Wąsewo, which lies approximately 17 kilometres (10 mi) north-west of Ostrów Mazowiecka and 85 km (52 mi) north-east of Warsaw.

Villages
Gmina Wąsewo contains the villages and settlements of Bagatele, Bartosy, Brudki Nowe, Brudki Stare, Brzezienko, Choiny, Czesin, Dalekie, Grądy, Grębki, Jarząbka, Króle, Majdan Suski, Mokrylas, Przedświt, Przyborowie, Rososz, Ruda, Rynek, Rząśnik Szlachecki, Rząśnik Włościański, Rząśnik-Majdan, Trynosy, Ulasek, Wąsewo, Wąsewo-Kolonia, Wąsewo-Lachowiec, Wysocze, Zastawie and Zgorzałowo.

Neighbouring gminas
Gmina Wąsewo is bordered by the gminas of Czerwin, Długosiodło, Goworowo and Ostrów Mazowiecka.

References

Polish official population figures 2006

Wasewo
Ostrów Mazowiecka County